Zakaria Diallo (born 11 August 1986) is a French-Senegalese professional footballer who plays as a defender, who is currently a free agent.

Club career

Le Havre and Beauvais
Diallo started playing football for the reserve team of professional club Le Havre in the Championnat de France amateur, the fourth tier of French football. After spending just half a year at the side he moved on a free transfer to Championnat National side AS Beauvais Oise. With Beauvais, Diallo played 22 games and scored once to wrap up the 2009–10 Championnat National season.

Charleroi
At the start of the 2010–11 season, Diallo joined Belgian Pro League side Sporting Charleroi. The 2010–11 season marked the first year for Diallo in top-flight football. He made six appearances, while being subbed in a further five. At the end of the season, Charleroi finished 16th and were relegated to the Belgian Second Division.

Dijon
In July 2011, Diallo moved to Dijon FCO on a free transfer for the 2011–12 Ligue 1 season.

Ajaccio
In June 2015, Diallo signed with AC Ajaccio from Dijon.

Brest
In 2016, Diallo joined Stade Brestois 29 after a year at Ajaccio.

Montreal Impact
In January 2018, Zakaria Diallo signed a two-year contract with the Montreal Impact.

Lens
On 14 August 2019, Diallo moved to French club RC Lens for a reported transfer fee of $150,000.

Al-Shabab
On 16 August 2021, Diallo moved to Kuwaiti club Al-Shabab for one season. He left the club in January 2022.

NorthEast United
On 13 January 2022, Diallo joined Indian Super League club NorthEast United.

Return to Le Havre
On 26 July 2022, Diallo returned to Le Havre on a one-year deal.

Career statistics

References

Living people
1986 births
French sportspeople of Senegalese descent
Association football defenders
French footballers
AS Beauvais Oise players
R. Charleroi S.C. players
Dijon FCO players
AC Ajaccio players
Stade Brestois 29 players
CF Montréal players
Al-Shabab SC (Kuwait) players
RC Lens players
NorthEast United FC players
Le Havre AC players
Belgian Pro League players
Ligue 1 players
Ligue 2 players
Kuwait Premier League players
Championnat National players
Major League Soccer players
Indian Super League players
French expatriate footballers
French expatriate sportspeople in Belgium
Expatriate footballers in Belgium
French expatriate sportspeople in Canada
Expatriate soccer players in Canada
French expatriate sportspeople in Kuwait
Expatriate footballers in Kuwait
French expatriate sportspeople in India
Expatriate footballers in India